Dimitrije "Mita" Rakić  (Mionica, Principality of Serbia, 15/27 October 1846 - Belgrade, Kingdom of Serbia, 17 March 1890) was a Serbian writer, historian, politician, translator, philosopher, diplomat, economist and Minister of Finance. He pursued a philosophy of social mechanism as an administrator for the Ministry of Finance. He is the father of poet Milan Rakić.

Background
Rakić was born on the 15 of October (Old Style) or 27 October (Gregorian Calendar) 1846 into a prominent military family in Mionica. Literature and culture were abiding passions in the family. He studied at the Grandes écoles in Belgrade and later went abroad to pursue further studies in economics in Munich, Zurich, Göttingen, and London. Upon his return to Serbia he was one of the founders of the political magazine Videlo which became quite influential.

Career and publications 
Rakić became the administrator of the ministry of finance but was fired in June 1880 after a disagreement with Vladimir Jovanovic. This incident became controversial after Videlo responded by publishing Rakić's account of the dismissal and the reprinting of Jovanovic liberal articles during the 1860s.

He translated the works of major foreign writers, like Victor Hugo's Les Misérables;Michał Czajkowski's Cossack Tales; John William Draper's History of the Intellectual Development of Europe; and works by Ludwig Feuerbach.

From 1868 to 1876 he edited Škola (School), a tri-monthly scholastic journal. He was a voluminous writer on educational subjects and was the author of various school-textbooks. He authored 100 books, including several novels, and published hundreds of studies, papers, monographs, and learned articles. Among his pedagogical textbooks were: Schools in Serbia (1868); A Study Guide (1869); Pedagogical Studies (1870); School Hygiene (1870); History of Pedagogy (1871); School Discipline (1871); Adolph Diesterweg (1871); Schools for the Rights of Citizens and Responsibilities (1873). The Byzantine imperial city on the slopes of the Radan mountain in the municipality of Lebane was discovered because of Rakić's writings.

In 1881 he received the Order of the Takovo Cross and other equally prestigious awards.

References 

Finance ministers of Serbia
People from Mionica
Serbian writers
Serbian politicians
Serbian translators
Serbian philosophers
Serbian diplomats
Serbian economists
1846 births
1890 deaths
19th-century translators